La Good Life is the second solo album from R&B singer/rapper K.Maro. The first official single from the album was "Femme Like U".

Track listing
"Femme Like U"
"Crazy"
"V.I.P."  
"La Good Life"  
"My Lady"  
"Walad B'ladi"  
"Au Top"  
"Sous l'Oeil de l'Ange"  
"Rolling Down"  
"Dense Dessus"  
"Qu'est Ce Que Ça Te Fout"  
"Que Dieu Me Pardonne"  
"Petits Princes"

Singles
 "Femme Like U"
 "Crazy"
 "Sous l'oeil de l'ange / Qu'est ce que ça te fout"

Certifications

References

2004 albums
K.Maro albums
East West Records albums
French-language albums